S. Manickaraj was an Indian politician and former Member of the Legislative Assembly. He was elected to the Tamil Nadu legislative assembly as an Anna Dravida Munnetra Kazhagam candidate from Nanguneri constituency in 2001 election.

References 

All India Anna Dravida Munnetra Kazhagam politicians
Year of birth missing (living people)
Living people